The standard liter per minute (SLM or SLPM) is a unit of volumetric flow rate of a gas at standard conditions for temperature and pressure (STP), which is most commonly practiced in the United States, whereas European practice revolves around the normal litre per minute (NLPM). Until 1982, STP was defined as a temperature of 273.15 K (0 °C, 32 °F) and an absolute pressure of 101.325 kPa (1 atm). Since 1982, STP is defined as a temperature of 273.15 K (0 °C, 32 °F) and an absolute pressure of 100 kPa (1 bar).

Conversions between each volume flow metric are calculated using the following formulas:

Prior to 1982,

Post 1982,

assuming zero degree Celsius reference point for STP when using SLPM, which differs from the "room" temperature reference for the NLPM standard. These methods are used due to differences in environmental temperatures and pressures during data collection.

In the SI system of units, the preferred unit for volumetric flow rate is cubic meter per second, equivalent to 60,000 liters per minute. If the gas is to be considered as an ideal gas, then SLPM can be expressed as mole per second using the molar gas constant  = 8.314510 J⋅K−1⋅mol−1:  mmol/s.

See also
 Flow measurement
 Gas laws
 Standard cubic foot (SCF)
 Standard cubic feet per minute (SCFM)

References

Fluid dynamics
Units of flow